Roger Habsch (born 5 January 1979) is a Belgian para-athlete who specializes in sprints. He represented Belgium at the 2020 Summer Paralympics.

Career
Habsch represented Belgium in the men's 100 metres T51 and 200 metres T51 events at the 2020 Summer Paralympics and won a bronze medal in both. Shortly before the 100 metres race, his chair was found damaged in a suspected act of sabotage.

References

1979 births
Living people
People from Verviers
Paralympic athletes of Belgium
Athletes (track and field) at the 2020 Summer Paralympics
Medalists at the 2020 Summer Paralympics
Paralympic bronze medalists for Belgium
Paralympic medalists in athletics (track and field)
Sportspeople from Liège Province